Björn Siegemund (born 30 September 1973) is a male badminton player from Germany.
He has 2 sons and a daughter.

Career
Siegemund competed in badminton at the 2004 Summer Olympics in mixed doubles with partner Nicol Pitro. They defeated Travis Denney and Kate Wilson-Smith of Australia in the first round but lost to Nathan Robertson and Gail Emms of Great Britain in the round of 16.

External links
 Profile at InternationalBadminton.org 
 
 

German male badminton players
Olympic badminton players of Germany
Badminton players at the 2004 Summer Olympics
1973 births
Living people
Badminton players at the 2000 Summer Olympics